Sodium metatitanate is a chemical compound with the chemical formula Na2TiO3. This compound decomposes with treatment with hot water. The name sodium metatitanate also incorrectly refers to the compound sodium trititanate (Na2Ti3O7).

Production
Sodium metatitanate can be produced by heating titanium dioxide and sodium carbonate at 1000 °C:
TiO2 + Na2CO3 → Na2TiO3 + CO2

References

Titanates
Sodium compounds